Olszyny may refer to:

Olszyny, Lower Silesian Voivodeship (south-west Poland)
Olszyny, Podlaskie Voivodeship (north-east Poland)
Olszyny, Łódź Voivodeship (central Poland)
Olszyny, Chrzanów County in Lesser Poland Voivodeship (south Poland)
Olszyny, Gmina Rzepiennik Strzyżewski in Lesser Poland Voivodeship (south Poland)
Olszyny, Gmina Wojnicz in Lesser Poland Voivodeship (south Poland)
Olszyny, Masovian Voivodeship (east-central Poland)
Olszyny, Pomeranian Voivodeship (north Poland)
Olszyny, Warmian-Masurian Voivodeship (north Poland)